The 2000 All-Ireland Senior Hurling Championship Final was the culmination of the 2000 All-Ireland Senior Hurling Championship.  It was played on 10 September 2000 between Kilkenny and Offaly. Kilkenny was appearing in their third All-Ireland final in-a-row after losing to Offaly in 1998 and to Cork in 1999. They were looking to capture a first championship title since 1993.  Offaly were lining out in their first championship decider since they won the title in 1998. Both sides last met in the championship in the Leinster final earlier in the year when Kilkenny succeeded in beating Offaly.

Match report
At 3:30 pm match referee Willie Barrett threw in the sliotar and the 112th Millennium All-Ireland final got underway.  Right from the throw-in, the Kilkenny men tore into the game.  Offaly errors, so atypical of them throughout the late 1990s, were capitalised on by the Kilkenny defenders and their forwards. Kilenny's D.J. Carey needed only six minutes to make his mark on this decider when he pounced on a mistake from Offaly corner-back Niall Claffey to score Kilkenny's opening goal.  Carey's sixth-minute goal was followed three minutes later by a Henry Shefflin three-pointer. Shefflin's effort was helped home by Carey but the umpire ruled that the ball had already crossed the line.  After ten minutes the score read 2-3 to 0-1 in Kilkenny's favour.  The last twenty-five minutes of the opening half saw Offaly get into the groove and score seven more points, five of which came from Johnny Dooley frees.  Offaly's only real goal chance, a ground stroke from Michael Duignan, went narrowly wide in the eighteenth minute. Kilkenny, however, created several opportunities to add to their two early goals and soon after Charlie Carter bagged a third goal for ‘the Cats’ four minutes before half-time. At the interval, in spite of Offaly's eighteen scoring chances to Kilkenny's fifteen, ‘the Cats’ had to a ten-point lead of 3-10 to 0-9.

At the beginning of the second half, the Offaly selectors made some tactical changes.  Wing-back Brian Whelahan and corner-forward Michael Duignan swapped positions while John Troy was brought from the substitutes' bench.  These changes failed to alter the dominance of Kilkenny as ‘the Cats’ looked likely to score a goal at any time of the game.  For the second time Shefflin was the man on hand to hit the fourth goal after latching onto a brilliant long clearance from substitute Canice Brennan and kicking the sliothar past Stephen Byrne from close range.  In the fifty-ninth minute Johnny Pilkington clawed one back for Offaly when his shot went past James McGarry.  An injury-time goal by substitute Eddie Brennan was the final decider as Kilkenny defeated their Leinster rivals by 5-15 to 1-14.  This game marked the end of the road for the great Offaly team of the 1990s while it was the beginning of a great decade of success for Kilkenny.

Match details

MATCH RULES
70 minutes.
Replay if scores level.
Five named substitutes

References

All-Ireland Senior Hurling Championship Final
All-Ireland Senior Hurling Championship Final, 2000
All-Ireland Senior Hurling Championship Final
All-Ireland Senior Hurling Championship Finals
Kilkenny GAA matches
Offaly GAA matches